Giovanni Marco Rutini (25 April 1723 – 22 December 1797) was an Italian composer.

Biography 
He was born in Florence and studied at the Naples Conservatorio della Pietà dei Turchini. In 1748 he came to Prague and joined the Locatelli ensemble. In the beginnings of his career he devoted himself mainly to the kapellmeister activities, and composed  predominantly the cembalo sonatas. Rutini performed his first "Prague opera", Alessandro nell´Indie, in 1750. Another opera, Semiramide riconosciuta, was dedicated to the "nobility of the Czech Kingdom". Rutini later moved with Locatelli and his group to the Russian St. Petersburg. He composed there the comic operas, mainly to the librettos of Carlo Goldoni. He was also the piano teacher of Catherine II, the future Russian empress. Since early 1760s he came back to Florence, and continued in the opera composing.

The manuscripts of his operas are stored in the Landesbibliothek in Dresden, in the library of the Florence conservatory, and also in Civico Museo Bibliographico in Bologna.

Operas 
Alessandro nell'Indie (to the libretto of Pietro Metastasio, 1750, Prague)
Semiramide (to the libretto of Pietro Metastasio, 1752, Prague)
Il retiro degli dei (to the libretto of Giovanni Battista Locatelli, 1757, St. Peterburg)
Il negligente (to the libretto of Carlo Goldoni, 1758, St. Peterburg)
Il caffè di campagna (to the libretto of Pietro Chiari, 1762, Bologna)
I matrimoni in maschera (Gli sposi in maschera; Il tutore burlato) (to the libretto of F. Casorri, 1763, Cremona)
Ezio (to the libretto of Pietro Metastasio, 1763, Florence)
L'olandese in Italia (to the libretto of N. Tassoi, 1765, Florence)
L'amore industrioso (to the libretto of G. Casorri, 1765, Venice)
Il contadino incivilito (to the libretto of O. Goretti, 1766, Florence)
Le contese domestiche (Le contese deluse) (intermezzo, 1766, Florence)
L'amor tra l'armi (to the libretto of N. Tassi, 1768, Siena)
Faloppa mercante (Gli sponsali di Faloppa) (1769, Florence)
La Nitteti (to the libretto of Pietro Metastasio, 1770, Modena)
L'amor per rigiro (to the libretto of N. Tassi, 1773, Florence)
Vologeso re de' Parti (to the libretto of Apostolo Zeno, 1775, Florence)
Sicotencal (to the libretto of C. Olivieri, 1776, Turin)
Il finto amante (1776, Pistoia)
Gli stravaganti

References

External links 
http://www.operone.de/komponist/rutini.html 

1723 births
1797 deaths
18th-century Italian male musicians
Italian Classical-period composers
Neapolitan school composers
18th-century Italian composers
Italian male classical composers
Italian opera composers
Male opera composers